ChromaDex is a dietary supplement and food ingredient company based in Los Angeles, California founded in 1999 that is publicly traded on the NASDAQ.

In 2011, ChromaDex licensed patents from Dartmouth College, Cornell University, and Washington University in St. Louis regarding nicotinamide riboside, which it markets and sells as an ingredient under the brand name Niagen. ChromaDex licensed patents from the University of Mississippi and the USDA to commercially develop pterostilbene and sell the compound under the brand name pTeroPure. ChromaDex no longer sells pTeroPure.

History 
Founded in 1999 by Frank Jaksch, ChromaDex first acquired licensed Dartmouth patents on nicotinamide riboside in 2012, leading to the commercialization of Niagen in 2013.  

ChromaDex is traded on the NASDAQ (as CDXC) as of April 2016 and was added to the U.S. Small Cap Russell 2000 Index in June 2018.  

In 2017, the company acquired HealthSpan Research LLC and its product Tru Niagen, a standalone nicotinamide riboside supplement, sold direct to U.S. consumers. Also in 2017, ChromaDex raised $48 million to support research and development.

References

External links
 

Biotechnology companies of the United States
Pharmaceutical companies of the United States
Pharmaceutical companies established in 1999
Companies based in Irvine, California
Biotechnology companies established in 1999
1999 establishments in California
Health care companies based in California